Premio Lo Nuestro 2004 was the 16th anniversary of a popular Latin Music Award show in U.S. The award show took place In Miami, Florida, and aired live on the Univision Network on Thursday, February 26, from 8-11 pm ET / PT (7-10 pm Central and Mountain). The show was hosted by Adal Ramones. The artists who performed in the show were:Ricky Martin, Thalía, Ricardo Arjona, Marco Antonio Solís, Sin Bandera,  La Oreja de Van Gogh, Montez de Durango, El General and many more. There was total of 180 nominations in 32 categories. The nominees list includes Ricky Martin and Ricardo Arjona, with four nominations each; La India, Marc Anthony, Marco Antonio Solís, Conjunto Primavera, Olga Tañón and Joan Sebastian with three nominations each; Shakira and Thalía with two nominations; and Juanes, Alexandre Pires, Maná, Pepe Aguilar, Vicente Fernández, and many more.

Presenters
A.B. Quintanilla
Rosalyn Sanchez
Julio Iglesias Jr.
Conjunto Primavera
Banda el Recodo
Jennifer Peña
Ninel Conde
Graciela Beltrán
Millie Corretjer
Giselle Blondet
Mariana Seoane
Niurka Marcos
Aracely Arámbula
Patricia Velásquez
Marlene Favela
Ricardo Alamo
Eugenio Derbez

Performers
Ricky Martin
La India
Thalía
Ricardo Arjona
Marco Antonio Solís
Sin Bandera
La Oreja de Van Gogh
Montez de Durango
El General
Víctor Manuelle
Akwid
Intocable

List of nominees and winners

Award for Excellence
Ricky Martin

Pop Category

Rock Category

Tropical Category

Regional Mexican Category

Urban Category

Video of the Year

References

Lo Nuestro Awards by year
2004 music awards
2004 in Florida
2004 in Latin music
2000s in Miami